Afdera is a moth genus of the superfamily Gelechioidea. It is placed in the subfamily Depressariinae, which is often – particularly in older treatments – considered a distinct family Depressariidae or included in the Elachistidae.

Species
Afdera jimenae Ogden & Parra, 2001
Afdera orphnaea (Meyrick, 1931)

References

, 2001, Revista Chilena de Historia Natural 74: 533-538. 

Depressariinae